A Time to Live and a Time to Love is a 1976 Estonian  drama film directed by Veljo Käsper.

Plot
Frankly frivolous and pretty Deborah gets under the wheels of the car, and then in serious condition is in hospital. Doctor Melts insists on kidney transplantation hopeless patient Professor Talvik, who, in turn, also needs urgent surgery. But the Professor is doing everything possible to save the girl's life.

Cast
Source:
 Aīda Zara – Deborah (as Aida Zars)
 Ita Ever – Deborah's mother
 Väino Uibo – Silver
 Anne Paluver – Epp
 Raili Jõeäär – Alla
 Heino Mandri – Professor Talvik
 Aarne Üksküla – Melts
 Mati Klooren – Puudersell
 Urmas Kibuspuu – Pukspuu
 Jüri Järvet – Minister
 Peeter Kard - Photographer Tuus
 Anne Paluver – Epp
 Salme Reek – Janitor
 Ülle Toming – Nurse
 Hilja Varem – Nurse
 Ellen Alaküla – Nurse

References

External links
 
 Aeg elada, aeg armastada, at Estonian Film Database

Soviet drama films
Soviet-era Estonian films
1976 films
Estonian-language films
1976 drama films
Films set in hospitals
Estonian drama films